Richard Henry Wilde (September 24, 1789 – September 10, 1847) was a United States representative and lawyer from Georgia.

Biography
Wilde was born in Dublin, Ireland, in 1789 to Richard Wilde and Mary Newitt, but came to America at age eight  and moved to Augusta, Georgia, in 1802. His brother was Judge John W. Wilde, a judge of Augusta, Georgia. He was a businessman and studied law. After gaining admittance to the state bar in 1809, Wilde practiced law in Augusta. He served as the solicitor general of the superior court of Richmond County, Georgia, and was also the attorney general of Georgia from 1811 to 1813 as a result of holding the Richmond County position.

In 1814, Wilde was elected as a Democratic-Republican Representative to the 14th United States Congress and served one term from March 4, 1815, until March 3, 1817, as he lost his reelection campaign in 1816. Upon Thomas W. Cobb's resignation, Wilde successfully ran as a Crawford Republican to fill that seat in the 18th Congress and served only a month from February 7, 1825, to March 3, 1825. After several more unsuccessful Congressional campaigns in 1824 and 1826, Wilde ran again in 1827 as a Jacksonian to fill the vacancy caused by the resignation of John Forsyth and won election to fill that term. He was reelected to three additional terms (21st, 22nd and 23rd Congresses) in that seat and served from November 17, 1827, to March 3, 1835.

Wilde lost his reelection campaign in 1834 and traveled in Europe from 1835 to 1840. In Italy he associated with Edward Everett, Horatio Greenough, Hiram Powers and Charles Sumner.

In 1843, Wilde moved to New Orleans, returned to the practice of law and served as a professor of constitutional law at the University of Louisiana at New Orleans (current-day Tulane University). Wilde died in New Orleans on September 10, 1847, and was interred in a vault in a cemetery in New Orleans. In 1854, he was reinterred at Sand Hill family burying ground near Augusta and then reinterred an additional time in 1886 in Augusta's City Cemetery.

Writings
Wilde wrote a well known poem Hesperia about the geography and topography of the United States. His magnum opus was an unfinished poem called "My life is like the Summer Rose" that he wrote to remember his brother, James Wilde, who was killed in a duel. He wrote several other works, prompting Rufus Wilmot Griswold to consider including him in one of his influential anthologies. Though he did provide several pieces for Griswold to include, Wilde responded, "As literature does no good for an advocate's reputation, I should be pleased if you will give my place... to somebody else." The only complete book-length work published in his lifetime was Conjectures and Researches concerning the Love, Madness, and Imprisonment of Torquato Tasso (1842). Two works left incomplete were Life and Times of Dante and Specimens of the Italian Lyric Poets.

References

Further reading

External links
 
 
 Duellist's Grave historical marker

1789 births
1847 deaths
Members of the Georgia House of Representatives
Georgia (U.S. state) state senators
Georgia (U.S. state) lawyers
Politicians from Augusta, Georgia
Politicians from Dublin (city)
Tulane University faculty
19th-century American poets
American male poets
Democratic-Republican Party members of the United States House of Representatives from Georgia (U.S. state)
Jacksonian members of the United States House of Representatives from Georgia (U.S. state)
American slave owners
19th-century American politicians